The Duke is a 1999 comedy film. Its plot concerns a dog, Hubert, inheriting a Scottish country mansion.

Plot
When the kind hearted duke of the manor dies, he leaves his estate and his dukedom to his Black and Tan Coonhound, Hubert, with Charlotte the Butler's niece as his guardian. However, two greedy relatives have it in for the dog, as they scheme to take over the manor.

Cast
 John Neville as The Duke
 James Doohan as Clive Chives
 Courtnee Draper as Charlotte
 Jeremy Maxwell as Florian
 Judy Geeson as Lady Fautblossom
 Carolyn Sadowska as The Queen
 Oliver Muirhead as Cecil Cavendish
 Sophie Uliano as Shamela Stewart 
 Paxton Whitehead as Basil Rathwood
 Frank C. Turner as Parsnip

References

External links
 
 
 

1999 direct-to-video films
British direct-to-video films
Canadian direct-to-video films
1999 comedy films
British comedy films
Buena Vista Home Entertainment direct-to-video films
Canadian comedy films
English-language Canadian films
1999 films
1990s English-language films
1990s Canadian films
1990s British films